Godfred Karikari (born 11 March 1985) is a former Ghanaian-born Hong Kong professional footballer.

Early life
Godfred Karikari was born to an affluent family in Ghana. He was a fast runner in his youth and was invited to join the school's track and field team, but he chose to play football instead. He was introduced to Hong Kong football by his manager and has not returned to Ghana since. His family members, whom he visits when he is on holiday, live in the United States and the United Kingdom today.

Club career

Early career
Godfred arrived in Hong Kong in 2002 and joined Fukien. In 2005, he moved to Rangers (HKG).

Happy Valley
Godfred moved to Happy Valley in January 2008. He scored 9 goals in the remainder of the season. Although the club decided to use a youth strategy for 2009–10 season, his contract was renewed. The club finished last  of the 10 clubs in the season and Godfred left the club for TSW Pegasus.

Pegasus
Godfred joined Pegasus. On 11 September 2010, he scored 3 goals in TSW Pegasus' 5:1 victory over HKFC. On 1 April 2011, he scored another hat-trick against Tai Chung FC in a 7:1 win. In total, he scored 13 goals for TSW Pegasus in all local competitions in the 2010–11 season.

In the 2011–12 season, Godfred continued his good form by scoring 6 goals in 3 games, including a hat-trick against Sham Shui Po on 24 September 2011. Godfred was voted Most Valuable Player of Month in September 2011 by the Hong Kong Sports Press Association.

Henan Jianye
On 13 June 2012, Godfred moved to mainland China and signed a contract with Chinese Super League side Henan Jianye. He joined as a Hong Kong Chinese player and therefore not occupying any foreigners quotas of the club. He made his debut for Henan on 23 June, in a 0–0 away draw against Dalian Shide. His first goal for Henan came on 4 days later, which ensured Henan beat Chongqing Lifan 2–0 in the third round of 2012 Chinese FA Cup.

Shenzhen Ruby
In February 2014, Godfred transferred to China League One side Shenzhen Ruby.

Beijing Baxy
In July 2014, Godfred transferred to another China League One club Beijing Baxy.

Qingdao Huanghai
On 4 January 2016, Godfred signed by another China League One club Qingdao Huanghai.

R&F
After six years abroad, Karikari returned to Hong Kong's top flight, and signed with R&F on 19 January 2018.

On 19 June 2019, head coach Yeung Ching Kwong announced that Karikari would not be retained.

Kitchee
On 5 February 2020, Karikari signed with another HKPL club Kitchee.
However, he failed to make any appearances during his spell at the club due to the spreading of Coronavirus which makes the HKPL being suspended from mid of March 2020.

Karikari left the club after his contract expired in July 2020.

International career

Godfred has spent more than seven years playing football in Hong Kong. He received his Hong Kong Permanent Identity Card on 7 February 2011. His lack of a Hong Kong SAR passport meant he was unable to be registered as a Hong Kong player in the 2011 AFC Cup and was also unable to represent Hong Kong in international matches. Due to his late application, he didn't receive his passport to represent Hong Kong until November 2011. On 2 December, he was called up by caretaker Hong Kong coach Liu Chun Fai for the 2012 Guangdong-Hong Kong Cup squad. Godfred Karikari scored on his debut for Hong Kong in the 2012 Guangdong-Hong Kong Cup as the match ended 2-2.

Godfred has yet to obtain his Hong Kong passport, but is still being drafted into new head coach Ernie Merrick's 27-member training squad. "I was told the passport is ready and the only thing the Hong Kong Immigration Department needs is a confirmation letter from the Ghana government that I have given up my original nationality, normally, it can take some time, but I have written to the Ghana government, pressuring them to give me the papers as soon as possible. It's my dream to play for Hong Kong at international level. I hope the good news can come soon so that I can be part of the team." On 11 April 2012, Hong Kong head coach Ernie Merrick confirmed that Godfred Karikari's nationality change has been approved and he can now represent Hong Kong. Merrick considers his addition to the team will be very helpful.

Godfred scored his first international goal for Hong Kong against Bhutan on 11 June 2015 in a 2018 FIFA World Cup qualifier.

Career statistics

Club
As of 5 February 2020

International
As of 15 October 2013

International goals
As of 5 October 2017

Honours

Club
Henan Jianye
China League One: 2013

International
Hong Kong
Guangdong-Hong Kong Cup: 2012

References

External links
Godfred Karikari at HKFA
Profile at TSW Pegasus FC

1985 births
Living people
Footballers from Kumasi
Hong Kong footballers
Hong Kong international footballers
Hong Kong people of Ghanaian descent
Ghanaian footballers
Ghanaian emigrants to Hong Kong
Association football forwards
Expatriate footballers in Hong Kong
Happy Valley AA players
Henan Songshan Longmen F.C. players
Shenzhen F.C. players
Beijing Sport University F.C. players
Qingdao F.C. players
Hong Kong First Division League players
People with acquired permanent residency of Hong Kong
Hong Kong expatriate sportspeople in China
Chinese Super League players
China League One players
Hong Kong expatriate footballers
Naturalized footballers of Hong Kong
R&F (Hong Kong) players
Kitchee SC players
Hong Kong Premier League players